Clarefield Park is a small park and Site of Local Importance for Nature Conservation in Brent Cross in the London Borough of Barnet.

It was developed on former wasteland, and has mown grassland, a children's playground and sports facilities.

There is access from Claremont Way.

In October 2010, Barnet Council gave planning consent for the Brent Cross Cricklewood Planning Application which includes closure of the park and development of the area, but as of August 2019, the park is still open.

See also
 Barnet parks and open spaces
 Nature reserves in Barnet

References

Further reading

Nature reserves in the London Borough of Barnet
Parks and open spaces in the London Borough of Barnet